Acanthosaura cardamomensis is a species of Agamid lizard found in eastern Thailand, western Cambodia and Vietnam. Its name derives from the Cardamom Mountains in eastern Thailand.  It was first identified in 2010.

References

External links
 Photo of Acanthosaura cardamomensis in Khao Yai National Park, Thailand
 Photo of Acanthosaura cardamomensis in Cardamom Mountains, Cambodia

cardamomensis
Reptiles of Thailand
Reptiles of Cambodia
Reptiles described in 2010
Taxa named by Perry L. Wood
Taxa named by Larry Lee Grismer
Taxa named by Thy Neang